The Susquehanna River (Lenape: Siskëwahane) is a major river located in the Mid-Atlantic region of the United States, overlapping between the lower Northeast and the Upland South. By watershed area, it is the 16th-largest river in the United States, and also the longest river in the early 21st-century continental United States without commercial boat traffic.

The Susquehanna River forms from two main branches: the North Branch, which rises in Cooperstown, New York, and is regarded by federal mapmakers as the main branch or headwaters, and the West Branch, which rises in western Pennsylvania and joins the main branch near Northumberland in central Pennsylvania.

The river drains , including nearly half of the land area of Pennsylvania. The drainage basin includes portions of the Allegheny Plateau region of the Appalachian Mountains, cutting through a succession of water gaps in a broad zigzag course to flow across the rural heartland of southeastern Pennsylvania and northeastern Maryland in the lateral near-parallel array of mountain ridges. The river empties into the northern end of the Chesapeake Bay at Perryville and Havre de Grace, Maryland, providing half of the Bay's freshwater inflow. The bay lies in the flooded valley, or ria, of the Susquehanna.

Geology
The Susquehanna River is one of the oldest existing rivers in the world, being dated as 320–340 Myr, older than the mountain ridges through which it flows. These ridges resulted from the Alleghenian orogeny uplift events, when Africa (as part of Gondwana) slammed into the Northern part of Euramerica. The Susquehanna basin reaches its ultimate outflow in the Chesapeake Bay. It was well established in the flat tidelands of eastern North America during the Mesozoic era about 252 to 66 million years ago. This is the same period when the Hudson, Delaware and Potomac rivers were established.

Course
Both branches and the lower Susquehanna were part of important regional transportation corridors. The river was extensively used for muscle-powered ferries, boats, and canal boat shipping of bulk goods in the brief decades before the Pennsylvania Canal System was eclipsed by the coming of age of steam-powered railways. While the railroad industry has been less prevalent since the closures and mergers of the 1950s–1960s, a wide-ranging rail transportation infrastructure still operates along the river's shores.

North Branch Susquehanna
Also called the Main Branch Susquehanna, the longer branch of the river rises at the outlet of Otsego Lake in Cooperstown, New York. From there, the north branch of the river runs west-southwest through rural farmland and dairy country, receiving the Unadilla River at Sidney. It dips south into Pennsylvania briefly to turn sharply 90 degrees west at Susquehanna and again 90 degrees north at Great Bend hooking back into New York. It receives the Chenango in downtown Binghamton. After meandering westwards, it turns south crossing the line again through the twin towns of Waverly, New York, and Sayre, Pennsylvania, and their large right bank railyard, once briefly holding the largest structure in the United States devoted to the maintenance and construction of railroad locomotives.

A couple of miles south, in Athens Township, Pennsylvania, it receives the Chemung from the northwest. It makes a right-angle curve between Sayre and Towanda to cut through the Endless Mountains in the Allegheny Plateau of Pennsylvania. It receives the Lackawanna River southwest of Scranton and turns sharply to the southwest, flowing through the former anthracite industrial heartland in the mountain ridges of northeastern Pennsylvania, past Pittston City (Greater Pittston), Wilkes-Barre, Nanticoke, Shickshinny, Berwick, Bloomsburg, and Danville, before receiving the West Branch at Northumberland.

West Branch Susquehanna

The origin of the official West Branch is near Elmora, Pennsylvania, in northern Cambria County near the contemporary  and US Route 219 (locally Plank Road). It travels northeasterly through the towns of Northern Cambria, Cherry Tree, Burnside, Mahaffey and Curwensville (where the river is dammed to form a lake), into and through Clearfield, where it receives Clearfield Creek.

The West Branch turns to the southeast and passes Karthaus (at Mosquito Creek), Keating (at Sinnemahoning Creek), Renovo and Lock Haven, where it receives Bald Eagle Creek. It passes Williamsport, where both Lycoming Creek and Loyalsock Creek empty into it, then turns south, passing Lewisburg, before joining the North Branch flowing from the northwest at Northumberland.

Main Susquehanna flow

Downstream from the confluence of its branches in Northumberland, the river flows south past Selinsgrove, where it is joined by its Penns Creek tributary, and cuts through a water gap at the western end of Mahantongo Mountain. It receives the Juniata River from the northwest at Duncannon, then passes through its last water gap, the Susquehanna Gap through the Blue Mountain Ridge, just northwest of Harrisburg.

Downtown Harrisburg developed on the east side of the river, which is nearly a mile wide here. Harrisburg is the largest city located on the lower river, which flows southeast across South Central Pennsylvania, forming the border between York and Lancaster counties, and receiving Swatara Creek from the northeast. The river enters the northern end of the Chesapeake Bay at Havre de Grace. Concord Point Light was built here in 1827 to accommodate the increasing navigational traffic.

Etymology
"Susquehanna" may come from the Lenape (Delaware) word siskëwahane meaning "Muddy River". Alternatively, it may come from the Len'api term Sisa'we'hak'hanna, which means "Oyster River". Oyster beds were widespread in the bay near the mouth of the river, which the Lenape farmed. They left oyster shell middens at their villages. A third account translates "Susquehanna" from Susquehannock language as "the stream that falls toward the south" or "long-crooked-river".

The Len'api were an Algonquian-speaking Native American people who had communities ranging from coastal Connecticut through New York and Long Island, and further south into New Jersey and Delaware in the mid-Atlantic area. Their settlements in Pennsylvania included Con'esto'ga ("Roof-place" or "town", modern Washington Boro, Lancaster County), also called Ka'ot'sch'ie'ra ("Place-crawfish", modern Chickisalunga, Lancaster County), or Gasch'guch'sa ("Great-fall-in-river", modern Conewago Falls, Lancaster County). They were called Minquas ("quite different"), or Sisa'we'hak'hanna'lenno'wak ("Oyster-river-people") by others. The Len'api also called the area Sisa'we'hak'hanna'unk ("Oyster-river-place").

Peoples of the mid-Atlantic Coast included coastal peoples who spoke Algonquian languages, such as the Len'api (whose bands spoke three dialects of Lenape), and Iroquoian languages-speaking peoples of the interior, such as the Eroni and the Five Nations of the Iroquois League, or Haudenosaunee. The English of Pennsylvania referred to the Eroni people of Conestoga as "Susquehannocks" or "Susquehannock Indians", a name derived from the Lenape term. In addition, John Smith of Jamestown, Virginia, labeled their settlement as "Sasquesahanough" on his 1612 map when he explored the upper Chesapeake Bay area. 

In Virginia and other southern colonies, Siouan-speaking tribes constituted a third major language family, with their peoples occupying much of the middle areas of the interior. Iroquoian speakers, such as the Cherokee and Tuscarora peoples, generally occupied areas to the interior near the Piedmont and foothills.

History

In 1615, the river was traversed by the French explorer Étienne Brûlé. In the 1670s the Conestoga, or Susquehannock people, succumbed to Iroquois conquest by the powerful Five Nations of the Iroquois League based in present-day New York, who wanted to control the fur trade with Europeans. The Susquehannock assimilated with the Iroquois. In the aftermath, the Iroquois resettled some of the semi-tributary Lenape in this area, as it was near the western boundary of the Lenape's former territory, known as Lenapehoking.

The Susquehanna River has continued to play an important role throughout the history of the United States. In the 18th century, William Penn, the founder of the Pennsylvania Colony, negotiated with the Lenape to allow white settlement in the area between the Delaware River and the Susquehanna, which was part of Lenape territory. In late colonial times, the river became an increasingly important transportation corridor, used to ship anthracite coal, discovered by Necho Allen, from its upper reaches in the mountains to the markets downriver.

In 1779 during the American Revolutionary War, General James Clinton led an expedition down the Susquehanna from its headwaters. His party had made the upper portion navigable by damming the river's source at Otsego Lake, allowing the lake's level to rise, and then destroying the dam and flooding the river in order for his flotilla to travel for miles downstream. James Fenimore Cooper described this event in the introduction to his historical novel, The Pioneers (1823).

At Athens, Pennsylvania, then known as Tioga or "Tioga Point", Clinton met with General John Sullivan and his forces, who had marched from Easton, Pennsylvania. Together on August 29, they defeated the Tories and warriors of allied Iroquois bands at the Battle of Newtown (near present-day Elmira, New York). This was part of what was known as the "Sullivan-Clinton Campaign" or the "Sullivan Expedition". They swept through western New York, dominated by the Seneca people, destroying more than 40 Seneca villages, as well as the stores of crops the people had set aside for winter. Many of the Iroquois left New York and went to Canada as refugees; casualties from exposure and starvation were high that winter.

Following the United States gaining independence in the Revolutionary War, in 1790 Colonel Timothy Matlack, Samuel Maclay and John Adlum were commissioned by the Supreme Executive Council of the Commonwealth of Pennsylvania to survey the headwaters of the Susquehanna river. They were to explore a route for a passage to connect the West Branch with the waters of the Allegheny River, which flowed to Pittsburgh and the Ohio River. In 1792, the Union Canal was proposed in order to link the Susquehanna and the Delaware rivers in Pennsylvania along Swatara and Tulpehocken creeks. In the 19th century, many industrial centers developed along the Susquehanna, using its water power to drive mills and coal machinery, to cool machines, and as a waterway for the transport of raw and manufactured goods.

Based on colonial charters, both Pennsylvania and Connecticut claimed land in the Wyoming Valley along the Susquehanna. Connecticut founded Westmoreland County here and defended its claim in the Pennamite Wars. Under federal arbitration, eventually the state ceded this territory to Pennsylvania.

In the 1790s English Lake Poets Robert Southey, Samuel Taylor Coleridge, and Robert Lovell formulated the "Pantisocracy Plan" to marry three sisters and move to the banks of the Susquehanna River to start a socialist experiment. They made the marriages but Southey moved to Lisbon, Portugal, to visit an uncle, and they abandoned the plan to move to the United States.

In 1833 John B. Jervis began a canal system to extend the Chenango River and connect the waters of the Susquehanna from Chenango Point to the Erie Canal, which ran through the Mohawk Valley of New York, ultimately connecting with Lake Erie through the Wood Canal. In October 1836, water from the Susquehanna was connected to the Erie Canal at Utica, New York. Water travel was the main form of transportation during that era. The Erie Canal dramatically expanded trade between communities around the Great Lakes and markets in New York and Pennsylvania. With the expansion of construction of railroad lines, canal-transport became unprofitable, as it could not compete in speed or flexibility.

The Susquehanna River figures in the history of the Latter Day Saint movement. It holds that Joseph Smith and Oliver Cowdery received the priesthood from heavenly beings at a site along the Susquehanna and performed their first baptisms of Latter Day Saints in the North Branch of the river. Smith and Cowdery said that they were visited on May 15, 1829, by the resurrected John the Baptist and given the Aaronic priesthood. Following his visit, Smith and Cowdery baptized each other in the river. Later that year, they said they were visited near the river by the apostles Peter, James and John. Both events took place in unspecified locations near the river's shore in Susquehanna County, Pennsylvania.

During the Civil War's 1863 Gettysburg Campaign, Union Major General Darius N. Couch, commander of the Department of the Susquehanna, resolved that Robert E. Lee's Confederate Army of Northern Virginia would not cross the Susquehanna. He positioned militia units under Maj. Granville Haller to protect key bridges in Harrisburg and Wrightsville, as well as nearby fords. Confederate forces reached the river at several locations in Cumberland and York counties.

Much of that precipitation was received into the Susquehanna from its western tributaries, and the valley suffered disastrous flooding. Wilkes-Barre, Pennsylvania, was among the hardest-hit communities and the capital Harrisburg was flooded. The Chesapeake Bay received so much fresh water that it altered the ecosystem, killing much of the marine life that depended on saltwater.

The Mid-Atlantic Flood of June 2006, caused by a stalled jet stream-driven storm system, affected portions of the river system. The worst affected area was Binghamton, New York, where record-setting flood levels forced the evacuation of thousands of residents.

In September 2011 the Susquehanna River and its communities were hit by Tropical Storm Lee, which caused the worst flooding since Agnes in 1972.

Bridges, ferries, canals and dams
The Susquehanna River is important in the transportation history of the United States. Before the Port Deposit Bridge opened in 1818, the river formed a barrier between the northern and southern states, as it could be crossed only by ferry. The earliest dams were constructed to support ferry operations in low water. The presence of many rapids in the river meant that while commercial traffic could navigate down the river in the high waters of the spring thaws, nothing could move up.The Susquehanna was improved by navigations throughout the 1820s and 1830s as the Pennsylvania Canal. Together with facilities of the Allegheny Portage Railroad, loaded barges were transferred from the canal and hoisted across the mountain ridge into the Pittsburgh area with access to the Monongahela, Allegheny Rivers and their confluence into the Ohio River flowing southwest towards the Mississippi River. The  Union Canal was completed in 1828 to connect the Schuylkill River (flowing southeast towards the Delaware River at Philadelphia) at Reading westwards to the Susquehanna River above the state capital of Harrisburg. Competition from faster transport via the railroad industry by the 1850s resulted in reducing the reliance on the river for transport.Two canal systems were constructed on the lower Susquehanna to bypass the rapids. The first was the Susquehanna Canal, also called the Conowingo Canal or the Port Deposit Canal, completed in 1802 by a Maryland company known as the Proprietors of the Susquehanna Canal. The second was the much longer and more successful Susquehanna and Tidewater Canal. The canals required dams to provide canal water and navigation pools.

As the industrial age progressed, bridges replaced ferries, and railroads replaced canals. The railroads were often constructed on top of the canal right-of-way along the river. Many canal remnants can be seen; for example, in Havre de Grace, Maryland, along US Route 15 in Pennsylvania, and in upstate New York at various locations. These latter remnants are parts of the upstream divisions of the Pennsylvania Canal, of privately funded canals, and of canals in the New York system.Today 200 bridges cross the Susquehanna. The Rockville Bridge, which crosses the river from Harrisburg to Marysville, Pennsylvania, is the longest stone masonry arch bridge in the world. It was built by the Pennsylvania Railroad in 1902, replacing an earlier iron bridge. Two seasonal ferries operate across the Susquehanna. The Millersburg Ferry at Millersburg, Pennsylvania, is a practical ferry for up to four vehicles and 50 passengers, while the Pride of the Susquehanna, based at Harrisburg, provides a passenger-only pleasure cruise.

Most of the canals have been filled in or are partially preserved as a part of historical parks. Dams generally are used to generate power or to provide lakes for recreation.

Environmental threats
The environmental group American Rivers named the Susquehanna "America's Most Endangered River for 2005" because of the excessive pollution it receives. Most of the pollution in the river is caused by excess animal manure from farming, agricultural runoff, urban and suburban stormwater runoff, and raw or inadequately treated sewage. In 2003 the river contributed 50% of the freshwater, 44% of the nitrogen, 21% of the phosphorus, and 21% of the sediment flowing into the Chesapeake Bay.

It was designated as one of the American Heritage Rivers in 1997. The designation provides for technical assistance from federal agencies to state and local governments working in the Susquehanna watershed.

Another environmental concern is radioactivity released during the 1979 Three Mile Island accident. However, extensive radionuclide studies over a 25-year period from 1979 through 2003, confirm that the Three Mile Island accident has not resulted in any harmful radiation effects. The areas in and along a 262-km length of the Susquehanna River in Pennsylvania were monitored for the presence of radioactive materials. This study began two months after the 1979 Three Mile Island (TMI) partial reactor meltdown; it spanned the next 25 years. Monitoring points included stations at the PPL Susquehanna and TMI nuclear power plants. Monthly gamma measurements documented concentrations of radionuclides from natural and anthropogenic sources. During this study, various series of gamma-emitting radionuclide concentration measurements were made in many general categories of animals, plants, and other inorganic matter, both within and near the river. Sampling began in 1979 before the first start-up of the PPL Susquehanna power plant. Although all species were not continuously monitored for the entire period, an extensive database was compiled. In 1986, the ongoing measurements detected fallout from the Chernobyl nuclear accident. These data may be used in support of dose or environmental transport calculations. The remaining reactor at Three Mile Island Nuclear Generating Station was shut down in 2019.

In 2015, a smallmouth bass with a rare, cancerous tumor was caught from the river, raising renewed concerns about toxic materials and water pollution. The Environmental Protection Agency reported, "we do not have sufficient data at this time to scientifically support listing the main stem of the Susquehanna as impaired."

Recreation
The Susquehanna River has attracted boaters who watch or fish for its migratory species. Many tourists and local residents use the Susquehanna in the summer for recreation purposes such as kayaking, canoeing, and motor-boating. Due to the high volume of smallmouth bass in the river, it is the host of numerous bass fishing tournaments each year and is regarded by many as one of the premier bass fishing rivers in North America. Canoe races are held annually on various sections of the river, such as the amateur race held in Oneonta, New York.

Susquehanna rowing and paddling have a long history. Starting in 1874, rowers from Shamokin Dam, Pennsylvania, raced men from Sunbury. The General Clinton Canoe Regatta, a  flat-water race, takes place each year in Bainbridge, New York, on Memorial Day weekend. Binghamton University Crew and Hiawatha Island Boat Club are also located on the river, in the Southern Tier of New York.

The Appalachian Trail passes through Duncannon, Pennsylvania, and crosses the Susquehanna on the Clarks Ferry Bridge.

See also

References

Further reading

External links

 U.S. Geological Survey: PA stream gaging stations
 Susquehanna River Basin Commission
 American Rivers article: Susquehanna River "Most Endangered"
 History of the Susquehanna River Ark
 Hiawatha Island Boat Club – Owego, New York
 Binghamton University Crew – Binghamton, New York

 
Rivers of Otsego County, New York
Rivers of Pennsylvania
Rivers of Maryland
Rivers of New York (state)
American Heritage Rivers
Tributaries of the Chesapeake Bay
Environment of the Mid-Atlantic states
Allegheny Plateau
Rivers of Broome County, New York
Rivers of York County, Pennsylvania
Rivers of Lancaster County, Pennsylvania
Rivers of Dauphin County, Pennsylvania
Rivers of Cumberland County, Pennsylvania
Rivers of Perry County, Pennsylvania
Rivers of Juniata County, Pennsylvania
Rivers of Snyder County, Pennsylvania
Rivers of Northumberland County, Pennsylvania
Rivers of Montour County, Pennsylvania
Rivers of Columbia County, Pennsylvania
Rivers of Luzerne County, Pennsylvania
Rivers of Lackawanna County, Pennsylvania
Rivers of Wyoming County, Pennsylvania
Rivers of Bradford County, Pennsylvania
Rivers of Susquehanna County, Pennsylvania
Significant places in Mormonism
Latter Day Saint movement in New York (state)
Latter Day Saint movement in Pennsylvania